Benjamin Kaufmann (born 22 November 1974) is a London-based fashion and beauty photographer.

Biography
Benjamin Kaufmann was born in Munich to Sylvia Kaufmann and Hans-Günther Kaufmann, photographer and brother of actress Christine Kaufmann.

After working as a graphic designer and assisting German photographers such as Michael Leis, Kaufmann moved to London to study for his Master of Arts at the Central Saint Martins. Since 2005, he has been working as a freelance photographer in the United Kingdom, Germany and Spain.

Photography
Kaufmann's works were published in Above magazine, UK, Cosmopolitan, Germany, Elle, Germany, Elle, Russia, Emirates Woman by Motivate Publishing, Glamour, Russia, Glamour, Spain, Glass magazine, Grazia, Italy, Grazia, UK, The Guardian, Harrods magazine, Hysterical, Jolie, Germany, L'Officiel, Spain, L'Optimum, CMN Magazine, Madame Figaro, Marie Claire, UK, Marie Claire, Spain, Marie Claire, Russia, Myself, Germany, Mujer Hoy, Petra, Germany, Snob Magazine, The Sunday Times, Tatler, Russia, Tirade, Twenty-6 magazine, View of the Times, Vogue, Spain, Vogue, Portugal, Vogue Pelle, Italy, Vogue, Turkey, 125 Magazine,  1968. 

His commercial clients include Artigiano, Asda, Atelier Bordelle, Audi, Bonmarche, Boucheron, Debenhams Dr. Hauschka]] El Corte Ingles (Sintesis, Amitie), George Cosmetics, Head & Shoulders, House of Fraser, KMS Hair, Kopas Cosmetics, Lily Blossom Madrid, Lipsy, Liv, Mappin & Webb, Nivea, Nocturne, Procter & Gamble, Roka, Schwarzkopf, Sony, Spiritu, Swarovski, The Bodyshop, and Unilever.

Videos
Kaufmann has directed commercial videos, music videos and Fashion Short Films. In 2014, he directed more than 150 video tutorials for Unilever's channel, 'All Things Hair' starring YouTuber such as Zoella, Tanya Burr, Elle and Blair Fowler and Ingrid Nilsen.

Charity
In addition to his work in fashion, Kaufmann regularly dedicates time to work for charitable causes. He has worked for the Kang Yung Foundation that supports education in rural China and the German/Austrian organisation Menschen für Menschen that operates in Ethiopia since 1981.

Since 2012, he has also collaborated with the Austrian charitable organisation Concordia Social Projects, which operates in Romania, Moldova and Bulgaria.

References

Other sources
 Rockenfeller Göber Artist Representation
 Gosee article on Benjamin Kaufmann
 Benjamin Kaufmann profile on Models.com
 Benjamin Kaufmann's profile on Le Book

External links
 
 Interview in Vogue
 Interview in Twenty6 Magazine
 Interview in GQ Magazine
 Benjamin Kaufmann & Callum Vincent

Living people
Fashion photographers
Charity fundraisers (people)
Alumni of Central Saint Martins
Alumni of Saint Martin's School of Art
Artists from London
Photographers from Munich
1974 births
German expatriates in the United Kingdom